Gerald Joseph Monaghan (February 27, 1915 – June 2, 1973) was a Canadian politician, who represented the electoral district of Sudbury in the Legislative Assembly of Ontario from 1955 until 1959. He was a member of the Ontario Progressive Conservative Party. He was born in Thurso, Quebec in 1915.

Prior to his election to the legislature, Monaghan was a city councillor in Sudbury. He died in 1973.

References

External links
 Biography at the Legislative Assembly of Ontario

1915 births
Progressive Conservative Party of Ontario MPPs
Sudbury, Ontario city councillors
1973 deaths